Hertfordshire County Council elections were held on 5 May 2005, with all 77 seats contested. The Conservative Party reinforced its hold on County Hall and only the loss of 2 seats in Dacorum Borough detracted from a strong showing across the County. It maintained a stranglehold on the Eastern part of the County, winning all of the seats in Broxbourne District and East Herts District.

The Liberal Democrats made a strong showing in Watford and St Albans District and made gains in Tring Division (Dacorum) and Chells Division (Stevenage) from Conservatives and Labour respectively.

The Labour Party were the main losers on the day, with a net loss of 11 seats and being beaten into third place in the popular vote. The Conservative Party and the Liberal Democrat Party were the main benefactors from Labour's poor performance, gaining 6 seats and 4 seats respectively. The Greens gained a single seat in Watford District (Callowland Leggatts), again at Labour's expense. Labour would find little consolation from this election suffering significant losses throughout the central and western parts of the County. Stevenage Borough remained as the only Labour stronghold and even here the Liberal Democrats won Chells Division.

Results

Results Summary By District

Division Results

Broxbourne (6 Seats)

Dacorum (10 Seats)

East Herts (10 Seats)

Hertsmere (7 Seats)

North Herts (9 Seats)

St Albans (10 Seats)

Stevenage (6 Seats)

Three Rivers (6 Seats)

Watford (6 Seats)

Welwyn Hatfield (7 Seats)

References

2005 English local elections
2005
2000s in Hertfordshire